Acrosterigma is a genus of large saltwater clams or cockles, marine bivalve mollusc in the family Cardiidae, the cockles.

Species
 Acrosterigma amirante Vidal, 1999
 Acrosterigma burchardi  (Dunker, 1877)
 Acrosterigma capricorne Vidal & Kirkendale, 2007
 Acrosterigma cygnorum (Deshayes, 1855)
 Acrosterigma dianthinum (Melvill & Standen, 1899)
 Acrosterigma discus Vidal, 1999
 Acrosterigma hobbsae Vidal, 1999
 Acrosterigma impolitum (G.B. Sowerby II, 1841)
 Acrosterigma kerslakae Healy & Lamprell, 1992
 Acrosterigma lomboke (Vidal, 2003)
 Acrosterigma maculosum (W. Wood, 1815)
 Acrosterigma magnum (Linnaeus, 1758)
 Acrosterigma marielae Wilson & Stevenson, 1977
 Acrosterigma mauritianum (Deshayes, 1855)
 Acrosterigma oxygonum (G.B. Sowerby II, 1834)
 Acrosterigma paulayi Vidal, 1999 †
 Acrosterigma pristipleura (Dall, 1901)
 Acrosterigma profundum Vidal, 1999
 Acrosterigma punctolineatum Healy & Lamprell, 1992
 Acrosterigma selene Vidal, 1999
 Acrosterigma seurati Vidal, 1999
 Acrosterigma simplex (Spengler, 1799)
 Acrosterigma sorenseni (Powell, 1958)
 Acrosterigma subassimile (Vidal, 2003)
 Acrosterigma suduirauti Vidal & Ter Poorten, 2007
 Acrosterigma suluanum Vidal, 1999
 Acrosterigma transcendens (Melvill & Standen, 1899)
 Acrosterigma triangulare Raines & Huber, 2012
 Acrosterigma uniornatum Vidal, 1999
 Acrosterigma variegatum (G.B. Sowerby II, 1840)

References
 WoRMS

Cardiidae
Bivalve genera